Jacques-Marie Rouzet (23 May 1743, Toulouse – 25 October 1820, Paris), comte de Folmon, was a French politician.  He was the lover of Louise Marie Adélaïde de Bourbon after the death of her husband the duke of Orleans. She made it to and after the French Revolution in the 1790s.

1743 births
1820 deaths
Politicians from Toulouse
Deputies to the French National Convention